Thetford Golf Course and Marsh is a  biological Site of Special Scientific Interest on the western outskirts of Thetford in Norfolk. It is a Nature Conservation Review site, Grade 2, and part of the Breckland Special Area of Conservation and Special Protection Area.

Dry grass heath covers much of this site but there are also areas of lichen and heather, with a diverse flora including uncommon plants. Horse Meadows has wet peaty areas have fenland plants and alder woodland.

Much of this site is private property with no public access, but roads go through it.

References

Sites of Special Scientific Interest in Norfolk
Nature Conservation Review sites
Special Protection Areas in England
Special Areas of Conservation in England